Zeta Circini, Latinized from ζ Circini, is the Bayer designation for a star located in the southern constellation of Circinus. With an apparent visual magnitude of 6.08, it is barely visible to the naked eye on a dark night. (According to the Bortle scale, it requires the lighting level of suburban skies or darker to be seen.) The distance to this star, as estimated using an annual parallax shift of 2.56 mas, is around 1,300 light years.

This is a B-type main sequence star with a stellar classification of B2/3 Vn,
where the 'n' suffix indicates broad ("nebulous") absorption lines due to rotation. It is a slowly pulsating B star with a frequency of 0.26877 d−1 and an amplitude of 0.0046 magnitude.

The star is around 32 million years old and is spinning rapidly with a projected rotational velocity of 264 km/s. It has an estimated 5.5 times the mass of the Sun and 3.8 times the Sun's radius. Zeta Circini radiates around 602 times the solar luminosity from its outer atmosphere at an effective temperature of 16,788 K.

References

Circini, Zeta
Circinus (constellation)
Circini, Zeta
131058
072965
5539
Durchmusterung objects